Another World is an album by pianist Andy LaVerne recorded in 1977 and released on the Danish label, SteepleChase.

Reception 

Ken Dryden of AllMusic states, "This trio date focuses exclusively on originals by this very underrated pianist, joined by bassist Mike Richmond and drummer Billy Hart. The intense and aptly named "Spiral" features some virtuoso playing by Richmond, as does the racehorse "Tall Boys." LaVerne's playing is especially notable on the dark ballad "Cream Puff" and the two takes of "Straight For Life"".

Track listing 
All compositions by Andy LaVerne
 "Spiral" – 5:38
 "Another World" – 3:56
 "Tallboys" – 5:20
 "Arizona" – 6:16
 "Cream Puff" – 7:57
 "Utah" – 5:35
 "Straight for Life" – 6:08
 "Fleur de Lys" – 1:41
 "Arizona" [take 2] – 6:26 Bonus track on CD
 "Straight for Life" [take 1] – 5:58 Bonus track on CD
 "Another World" [take 1] – 3:28 Bonus track on CD

Personnel 
Andy LaVerne – piano, synthesizer
Mike Richmond – bass
Billy Hart – drums

References 

 

Andy LaVerne albums
1977 albums
SteepleChase Records albums